Judith Aberg is an American physician who is the George Baehr Professor of Clinical Medicine at Mount Sinai Hospital. She was appointed Dean of System Operations for Clinical Sciences at the Icahn School of Medicine at Mount Sinai. Her research considered infectious diseases, including HIV/AIDS and COVID-19.

Early life and education 
At the age of 14, Aberg's father suffered paralysis after having an operation on his back. She has credited her experience in hospital as motivation to study medicine. She had a difficult time as an adolescent, and was kicked out of her family home as a teenager when she became pregnant. In an attempt to earn enough money for university, she worked several different jobs, including at an amusement park, as a chef, a lawn mower and a lab technician. When her partner started working as a dentist, Aberg was able to attend medical school. Aberg was an undergraduate student in medicine at the Pennsylvania State University. She completed her medical residency at the Cleveland Clinic, where she was Chief Resident. After completing her medical training, Aberg was made a fellow in infectious diseases at the Washington University School of Medicine. She became increasingly aware that young men her age were dying with AIDS, and decided to focus on HIV/AIDS. She has said she was mentored by William Powderly to improve the health outcomes of people living with HIV (PLWHA), with a focus on using clinical observations to drive basic sciences.

Research and career 
Aberg worked on the faculty of the University of California, San Francisco, where she oversaw the AIDS Clinical Trial Unit. In San Francisco, she started to challenge conventional practices, for example, why to keep treating PLWHA with mycobacterium avium complex if they were regaining immunity to the virus. These treatments were making people ill and impacting their quality of life. She changed treatment guidelines, and switched her focus to developing primary care. Aberg started to investigate complications associated with having HIV, including cardiovascular issues and the pathogenesis of inflammation.

In 2004, Aberg joined the faculty the New York University Grossman School of Medicine and the Bellevue Hospital. Aberg served as Director of Virology and lead of the AIDS Clinical Trials Unit. She worked to improve the outcomes of PLWHA and advocated to use evidence in decision-making.

Aberg joined the Mount Sinai Health System in 2014. In an article for The Journal of Infectious Diseases, Aberg said that women and people from other historically excluded groups feel obliged to participate in uncompensated institutional service. She called this burden "cultural taxation,", and noted that alongside this tax, there were considerable gender-based salary differences.

During the COVID-19 pandemic, Aberg started to work on therapeutic strategies for people with COVID-19. She studied the effectiveness of convalescent plasma.  She is a member of the panel developing NIH Covid-19 treatment guidelines.

Awards and honors 
 2008 New York Linda Laubenstein Award
 2014 George Baehr Endowed Professorship of Clinical Medicine
 2018 Infectious Diseases Society of America Lifetime Achievement Award
 2021 Jacobi Medallion

Selected publications

Personal life 
Aberg left her husband during medical school. He moved to Saudi Arabia and she raised her child alone.

References

External links
 PubMed search for Judith Aberg

American medical researchers
Living people
Year of birth missing (living people)
Pennsylvania State University alumni
University of California, San Francisco faculty
Icahn School of Medicine at Mount Sinai faculty
21st-century American physicians
21st-century American women physicians
Fellows of the American College of Physicians
Women medical researchers
Washington University in St. Louis fellows
New York University Grossman School of Medicine faculty